Lipica may refer to several places:

Poland 

Lipica, Poland, a village in the Province of Warmia-Masuria

Serbia 

Lipica (Tutin), a village in the Municipality of Tutin

Slovenia 

Lipica (border crossing), a border crossing near Lipica between Slovenia and Italy 
Lipica (hill), a hill (979 m) in Golac in the Municipality of Hrpelje–Kozina
Lipica (ridge), a ridge (950 m) in Golac in the Municipality of Hrpelje–Kozina
Lipica, Šentjur, a hamlet of Podgrad in the Municipality of Šentjur
Lipica, Škofja Loka, a settlement in the Municipality of Škofja Loka
Lipica, Sežana, a settlement in the Municipality of Sežana and the origin of the Lipizzan horse